Leandro Morante (born 18 April 1997) is a French professional footballer who plays as a defender for  club FBBP01.

Career
Morante signed with Béziers after almost enrolling in an American university. He transferred to Châteauroux, and made his professional debut with them in a 1–1 Ligue 2 tie with Le Havre AC on 17 October 2020.

On 19 July 2022, Morante signed with FBBP01.

Personal life
Morante was born in Montpellier, France to a Spanish father and Senegalese mother.

References

External links
 

1997 births
Living people
Footballers from Montpellier
French footballers
French people of Spanish descent
French sportspeople of Senegalese descent
Association football defenders
AS Béziers (2007) players
LB Châteauroux players
Football Bourg-en-Bresse Péronnas 01 players
Ligue 2 players
Championnat National players
Championnat National 3 players